Germany, Austria and Switzerland operate the largest interconnected 15 kV 16.7 Hz system, which has central generation, a special transmission network, central and decentral converter plants.

Germany 
In Germany, the voltage of traction current grid is 110 kV. In the Northeastern parts of Germany there is no traction current grid, as decentralized converter plants situated at the substations are used.

Switching stations 
Switching stations without power conversion, generation or feeding of overhead wires.

Central converter plants 
In these facilities AC from the public grid is transformed into single phase AC and fed into traction current grid.
At some facilities, power is also fed to the overhead wires. Conversion is made by machines or by electronic means.

Decentral converter plants 
In these facilities AC from the public grid is transformed into single phase AC and fed only to the overhead wires. Conversion is made by machines or by electronic means.

Power plants

Border crossing powerlines

Germany - Austria

Former inner German border

Points, where two powerlines for traction current crosses each other without interconnection

Switzerland 
In Switzerland, the voltage levels of the traction power grid are 132 kV/66 kV. At Muttenz and Etzwilen, there are transformers for coupling to 110 kV level of the traction power grid of Germany.

Substations 
In these facilities electricity is transformed down from 132 kV or 66 kV to 15 kV.
There is no conversion or generation of power.

Central converter plants 
In these facilities AC from the public grid is transformed into single phase AC and fed into the traction current grid.
At some facilities, power is also fed to the overhead wires. Conversion is made by machines or by electronic means.

Switching stations 
Switching stations without power conversion, generation or feeding of overhead wires.

Power plants

Border crossing powerlines

Germany-Switzerland

Points, where two powerlines for traction current crosses each other without interconnection

Austria 
In Austria, the voltage of traction current grid is 110 kV, except of the lines
Meidling-Hütteldorf, Hütteldorf-Auhof, Hütteldorf-Floridsdorf, Floridsdorf-Simmering and Meidling-Simmering, which are operated with 55 kV.

Substations 
In these facilities electricity is transformed down from 110/55 kV-level of OBB to 15 kV.
There is no conversion or generation of power.

Central converter plants 
In these facilities, AC from the public grid is transformed into single phase AC and fed into the traction current grid. At some facilities, power is also fed to overhead wires. Conversion may be performed mechanically or electronically.

Power plants

Points, where two powerlines for traction current crosses each other without interconnection

See also 
 Electric power supply system of railways in Norway
 List of installations for 15 kV AC railway electrification in Sweden
 List of power stations in Germany
 List of power stations in Austria
 List of power stations in Switzerland

References

Traction power networks
Rail transport-related lists
Austrian railway-related lists
German railway-related lists
Swiss railway-related lists
Germany, Austria And Switzerland
 
 
 
 
 
 

de:Liste von Bahnstromanlagen in Deutschland
de:Liste von Bahnstromanlagen in Österreich
de:Liste von Bahnstromanlagen in der Schweiz